Yaghi is an Arabic surname.

Notable people with the surname include:

 Brigitte Yaghi (born 1987), Lebanese pop singer
 Kenan Yaghi (born 1976), Syrian politician
 Racha Yaghi (born 2002), Lebanese footballer
 Omar M. Yaghi (born 1965), American-Jordanian academic

See also 

 Yagi (surname)
 Yağısıyan
 The Outlaw, a film known as Yaghi in Persian

Surnames
Surnames of Arabic origin
Arabic-language surnames
Surnames of Lebanese origin